Menos el Oso is the second studio album from Minus the Bear and was released on August 23, 2005 by Suicide Squeeze Records. The album title is a Spanish translation of "Minus the Bear."

Track listing

Personnel

Jake Snider - Vocals & Guitar
Dave Knudson - Guitar
Erin Tate - Drums
Cory Murchy - Bass
Matt Bayles - Electronics
James SK Wān - Bamboo Flute

Production
 Additional production by Chris Common
 Engineered by Matt Bayles, Chris Common, and Jake Snider
 Additional engineering by Alex Rose
 Mixed by Matt Bayles
 Mastered by Ed Brooks

References

Suicide Squeeze Records albums
Minus the Bear albums
2005 albums
Albums produced by Matt Bayles